John Hoover (October 13, 1919 – September 3, 2011) was an American artist, known for his creation of contemporary art pieces based on Native Alaskan traditions.

Hoover was born in Cordova to a Dutch father and an Aleut-Russian mother. He worked as a ski instructor and commercial fisherman, before taking up a career in art after designing and building a fishing boat in his backyard which he considered like a sculpture.

Hoover's work was exhibited internationally, and his artworks feature prominently in several Anchorage buildings such as the William A. Egan Civic and Convention Center, the Alaska Native Medical Center and the Alaska Native Heritage Center.

In 2002, he was honored with a retrospective of his work at the Anchorage Museum, and he was awarded an honorary doctorate by the University of Alaska Anchorage in May 2011.

Hoover died at his home near Grapeview on the Puget Sound in Washington state on September 3, 2011, aged 91.

References

External links
 John Hoover, Aleut, Quintana Galleries Indigenous Art

1919 births
2011 deaths
Alaska Native people
American people of Aleut descent
American people of Dutch descent
American people of Russian descent
20th-century American sculptors
Artists from Alaska
People from Cordova, Alaska
21st-century American sculptors
Sculptors from Alaska